Jamie Cerretani, (born October 2, 1981) is an American professional tennis player. A doubles specialist, he has won four ATP World Tour titles in his career. He reached his career-high doubles ranking of World No. 45 on July 21, 2008.

Amateur career
Cerretani attended Brown University, where he earned Ivy League Rookie of the Year honors in 2001 and graduated from Brown in 2004 with a degree in International Relations and Business Economics.

ATP career finals

Doubles: 7 (4 titles, 3 runner-ups)

Challenger and Futures finals

Singles: 1 (0–1)

Doubles: 62 (28–34)

Doubles performance timeline

''This table is current through 2019 US Open.

References

External links
 
 

1981 births
Living people
American male tennis players
Brown Bears men's tennis players
People from Reading, Massachusetts
Sportspeople from Middlesex County, Massachusetts
Tennis people from Massachusetts